Lophocampa citrinula is a moth of the family Erebidae. It was described by Felix Bryk in 1953. It is found in Peru.

References

 Natural History Museum Lepidoptera generic names catalog

citrinula
Moths described in 1953